Eugene Wilde (born Ronald Eugene Broomfield, December 6, 1961) is an American R&B singer who had two No. 1 hits on the US Billboard R&B charts in the 1980s.

Career
Broomfield was born in North Miami Beach, Florida and raised in Miami. He grew up as part of a family group, La Voyage, playing in local clubs. In the 1970s, the group became Tight Connection, and was later known as Simplicious. Broomfield also recorded an album with Curtom Records in 1979 as a member of Today, Tomorrow, Forever.

On learning Broomfield's middle name was Eugene, his manager insisted that he go by that name professionally; the last name was inspired by Broomfield seeing an advertisement for a New York club named Wildflower's.

In 1984, Eugene Wilde joined Philly World Records, and wrote and recorded his first hit, "Gotta Get You Home Tonight". It rose to No. 1 on the US Hot R&B/Hip-Hop Songs chart, and also made No. 18 on the UK Singles Chart.  After a couple of less successful follow-ups, he hit No. 1 again a year later with "Don't Say No Tonight."  He also had some lesser hits, including "Diana" (1986). His track "Personality" peaked at No. 34 in the UK. Subsequent releases on the MCA label, solo and with the group Cabo Frio, ("I'll Get Back to You", 1987)  were less successful.

In 1985, Wilde appeared in the film Rappin' with Joanna Gardner, where they performed the song, "First Love Never Dies", a duet that also appeared on the film's soundtrack.

In 1987, he recorded a duet with Sheena Easton, "What If We Fall in Love", which appeared on Easton's album, No Sound But a Heart. He later ran the independent label Wilde City Records in Florida.

Starting in the 1990s, Wilde found success behind the scenes as a songwriter, having penned "I'll Never Break Your Heart" with Albert Manno for the Backstreet Boys. He co-wrote album track "Dear Diary" with Jason Blume and Britney Spears for Spears's 2000 album Oops!... I Did It Again. He co-wrote the song "I Wish" with Peter Biker, and Kenneth Karlin and Carsten Schack (who are better known as the Danish production/songwriting duo Soulshock & Karlin) for Victoria Beckham for her 2001 self-titled album - which was planned as Beckham's third single, a duet with Robbie Craig, but the release was canceled. The song was in the film Bend It Like Beckham, whose title referenced Victoria's husband, David Beckham.

In 2010, the Danish production duo of Rob Hardt and Frank Ryle, known as Cool Million, released the title song of their new CD, "Back for More" with Wilde providing the lead vocal, announced with a teaser video via their YouTube account, rylehardtmillion. "Back for More" was written by Wilde with Hardt, Ryle, and his son Du Juan. This same group, along with Felix Luis Collazo II and Diane Williams, co-wrote another track, "Loose", which featured Wilde singing a duet with his sister Dee Dee Wilde which also had a teaser YouTube video.

In 2018, Wilde launched a new record label, 50ish Music Group.

Discography

Studio albums

Compilations
The Best of Eugene Wilde - Got to Get You Home Tonight (1996)
Eugene Wilde - The Greatest Hits (2004)

Singles

See also
List of artists who reached number one on the Billboard R&B chart
List of number-one R&B singles of 1985 (U.S.)
List of number-one R&B singles of 1986 (U.S.)

References

External links

Eugene Wilde Interview (2009)
"Gotta Get You Home Tonight" lyrics

Eugene Wilde Discography at Discogs.

1961 births
Living people
Songwriters from Florida
Musicians from Miami
American contemporary R&B singers
African-American male songwriters
21st-century African-American male singers
20th-century African-American male singers